In Norse mythology, Ifing (Old Norse, Ífingr) is a river that separates Asgard, the realm of the gods, from Jotunheim, the land of giants, according to stanza 16 of the poem Vafthrudnismal from the Poetic Edda:

"Ifing the river is called, which divides the earth
between the sons of giants and the gods;
freely it will flow through all time,
ice never forms on the river."

— Larrington trans.

John Lindow in Norse Mythology (2001) states in reference to Ifing that a river on which ice will never form is one that runs swiftly and therefore is extremely difficult to ford (thus forming an effective barrier between the worlds of gods and giants).

See also
 river Ilfing (Elbląg)

References
Larrington, Carolyne (transl.) (1996). The Poetic Edda. Oxford World's Classics. .
Lindow, John (2001). Norse Mythology. Oxford University Press. .

Rivers in Norse mythology
Mythological rivers